Mary Letitia Martin (1815–1850) was an Irish writer who was known as the "Princess of Connemara". Educated at home in the upper-class style, she was fluent in numerous languages. She published two books in her lifetime, and a third was published posthumously.

After losing her fortune during the Great Famine, Martin and her husband went to Belgium for a time, where she contributed to periodicals. They sailed to America in 1850, but Martin died 10 days after arrival due to complications of premature childbirth.

Biography
Martin was born into the chief landowning family of Connemara, the Martins of Ballynahinch Castle, a branch of the Martyn Tribe of Galway. Her parents were Thomas Barnwall Martin and Julia Kirwin; her paternal grandfather was Richard Martin MP (1754–1834).

Educated at home and by herself, Martin became fluent in Irish, English, French and a number of other languages. According to Maria Edgeworth, who had met her during her tour of Connemara in 1833, she was courted in 1834 by Count Adolphe de Werdinsky, whom she had met in London earlier that year. She refused to marry and de Werdinsky feigned a suicide attempt at Ballynahinch.

Martin published her first novel, St. Etienne, a Tale of the Vendean War, in 1845.

In 1847, she married a cousin, Colonel Arthur Gonne Bell. He took the name of Martin on marriage, by Royal Licence. In the same year, her father died of famine fever contracted while visiting his tenants in the Clifden workhouse.

Famine
In the following two years, her remaining fortune was destroyed in the famine as she attempted to alleviate its effects on her tenants. Penniless, she emigrated with her husband to Belgium. There she contributed to a number of periodicals, notably Encyclopaedie Des Gens Du Monde.

USA and death
In 1850, her autobiographical novel, Julia Howard, was published. That same year, the Martins sailed for America. She died ten days after arriving in New York City, following giving birth prematurely on board ship. The baby died, too. Her husband returned to England. He arranged for the posthumous publication of her novel, Deed, not Words (1857). In 1883, he was killed in a railway accident.

Select bibliography
 St. Etienne, a romance, 1845.
 Julia Howard. A Romance, London, Richard Bentley, 1850.
 Deeds, not Words; or, the Flemings of Dundalk. A Domestic Tale, London, G. Routledge, 1857.

See also

 The Tribes of Galway

Notes

References
 
 Humanity Dick, Shevawn Lynam, 1975.
 Galway Authors, Helen Maher, Roscommon, 1975.
 Connemara after the Famine: Journal of a Survey of the Martin Estate by Thomas Colville Scott, 1853. Edited by Tim Robinson, Dublin: The Lilliput Press, 1995.
 The Tribes of Galway, by Adrian James Martyn, Galway, 2001.
 The Eccentric Member for Galway, Peter Phillips, 2003.
 Maria Edgeworth, Tour in Connemara and the Martins of Ballinahinch, edited by Harold Edgeworth Butler. London 1950. Chapter II: A Sequel (pp. 80–101).
 The Gentleman's Magazine and Historical Review, vol. 35 (1851) p. 100
 Peter Phillips, Humanity Dick: the eccentric member for Galway, Parapress Limited, 2003 , 978-1-898594-76-5

External links
 http://www.libraryireland.com/biography/MaryLaetitiaBellMartin.php

1815 births
1850 deaths
People from County Galway
19th-century Irish novelists
19th-century Irish women writers
19th-century Irish writers
Irish expatriates in Belgium
Irish women novelists
Burials at Calvary Cemetery (Queens)
Deaths in childbirth